A Time for Love may refer to:

 Time for Love (film), a 1935 American animated film
 A Time for Love (film), a 1970 Hong Kong film
 Time for Love (radio program), a 1953–1954 American radio drama
 A Time for Love (Arturo Sandoval album), 2010
 A Time for Love (Tony Bennett album), 1966
 Time for Love, an album by Freddie Jackson, 1992
 "A Time for Love", a song written by Johnny Mandel and Paul Francis Webster for the film An American Dream, 1966

See also
 No Time for Love (disambiguation)